Mercedes Noel "Tety" Sahores Rosauer (born September 24, 1974) is an Argentine ski mountaineer and mountain climber. She is the first Argentine woman to climb the summit of the Mount Everest, on May 19, 2009.

Biography 
Sahores, daughter of Luis María Sahores Gattari and his wife Marta Irene Rosauer, was born in the Neuquén Province as the youngest of four children. Her oldest brother Luis María ("Minino") died from Leukemia at the age of 20 years.

Sahores attended the Colegio San Martín and afterwards the Instituto María Auxiliadora in San Pedro Sula, Honduras, until 1993. Afterwards she studied biology at CAECE University in Buenos Aires until 2000. She is member of the National Agricultural Technology Institute (INTA), lives in San Carlos de Bariloche.

Selected results 
 2005: 1st, South American Championship, individual
 2009: 1st, South American Championship, individual

References

External links 
 Mercedes Sahores at SkiMountaineering.org
 

1974 births
Living people
Argentine female ski mountaineers
Argentine mountain climbers
People from Neuquén Province
American summiters of Mount Everest